Sainshand is the capital of Dornogovi Province in Mongolia. It is located in the eastern Gobi desert steppe, on the Trans-Mongolian Railway.

Administration
The territory of Sainshand sum consists of 5 bags (communes).

Geography
The northern and southern parts are divided by a range of hills. The main Dornogovi Province institutions are located in the southern part of the city.

Population
The city has a population of 25,450 (2021 census), 19,548 (2006, est.), 19,891(2008, est.).

The population of the northern part was 4,944 at the end of 2006 and 4,822 at the end of 2008. The population of the southern part was 12,687 at the end of 2006 and 13,463  at the end of 2008.

Sights
The restored Buddhist monastery Khamariin Khiid (Khamar) is 30 kilometres (19 mi) south of the city and Sainshand itself. It houses a museum dedicated to the 19th century monastic and literary figure Danzanravjaa, a prominent leader of the Nyingma (Red Hat) school of Tibetan Buddhism. The Sainshand Wind Farm, a 55 MW wind generating station 5 km outside the city, started commercial operation in February 2019.

Climate

Sainshand experiences a desert climate (Köppen BWk) with long, very dry, very cold winters and short, hot summers.

Transport
The railway station on the Trans-Mongolian Railway is found in the northern part.

See also 

 Rail transport in Mongolia

References

External links

Saynshand at young-0.com

Aimag centers